The 2017 season was the 110th season in which the Richmond Football Club participated in the VFL/AFL. It ended with Richmond the premiers of the competition, the first time they had achieved it since 1980.

2016 off-season list changes

Retirements and delistings

Free agency

Trades

National draft

Rookie draft

2017 squad

2017 season

Pre-season

Home and away season

Finals

Ladder

Awards

League awards

All-Australian team

Brownlow Medal tally

Rising Star
Nominations:

22 Under 22 team

Club awards

Jack Dyer Medal

Michael Roach Medal

Reserves
The 2017 season marked the fourth consecutive year the Richmond Football club ran a stand-alone reserves team in the Victorian Football League (VFL). 
Richmond senior and rookie-listed players who were not selected to play in the AFL side were eligible to play for the team alongside a small squad of VFL-only listed players.

The team qualified for their first final series since being formed in 2014 and subsequently won final's against Collingwood, Casey and Box Hill to qualify for their first stand alone reserves grade grand final since 1997. They placed runners up after losing 11.8 (74) to 10.10 (70) to Port Melbourne.

Senior listed player Jacob Townsend won the J. J. Liston Trophy as the competition's best and fairest player.

Playing squad

References

External links
 Richmond Tigers Official AFL Site
 Official Site of the Australian Football League

Richmond Football Club seasons
Richmond Tigers